Enterprise Cotton Mills Building, also known as Zeus Industrial Products, is a historic cotton mill located at Orangeburg, Orangeburg County, South Carolina. It was built in 1896–1897, and is a four-story, 17 bay by 7 bay, brick building with a five-story tower.  Attached to the main building is a two-story brick engine room and a one-story brick boiler room.

It was added to the National Register of Historic Places in 1985.

References

Industrial buildings and structures on the National Register of Historic Places in South Carolina
Industrial buildings completed in 1897
Buildings and structures in Orangeburg County, South Carolina
National Register of Historic Places in Orangeburg County, South Carolina
Cotton mills in the United States
Textile mills in South Carolina